The Kheng people are found primarily in the Zhemgang, Trongsa, Bumthang, Dagana, and Mongar Districts of central Bhutan. They speak the Kheng language, a member of the extended Tibetan language family belonging to the East Bodish languages group; it is mutually intelligible with the Bumthang language and Kurtöp language to the north. The Kheng people are ethnolinguistically same as the Bumthang people and Kurtöp people of central Bhutan and are more closely related to Ngalop people of western Bhutan than to their neighbors in eastern Bhutan, who are primarily Sharchops and speak Tshangla language. SIL International estimates there are 50,000 Kheng speakers as of 2009.  

The people living in Kheng are devoted followers of Tibetan Buddhism, particularly of the Nyingma tradition. The cultural practices of people of central Bhutan typically mirror those of the dominant Ngalop people culture of the country. The term "Ngalop" may subsume several related linguistic and cultural groups, such as the Kheng, Kutöp, and Bumthang people.

Kheng people are known for secular and religious noble families such as numerous Dung families who had small fiefdoms until the 17th century.

See also
Ethnic groups in Bhutan
Kheng language
Bumthang language

References

External links

  
Ethnic groups in Bhutan